This is an order of battle of the French and German Armies at the beginning of the Franco-Prussian War in 1870.

France

Order of battle at the beginning of the war:

Army of the Rhine

Commander in Chief: Emperor Napoléon III
Chief of Staff: Marshal Edmond Le Bœuf

Imperial Guard Corps (Garde impériale) : Gen. Charles Denis Bourbaki
1st Infantry Division : Gen. Édouard-Jean-Étienne Deligny
1st Brigade : Gen. Auguste Henri Brincourt
1st Voltigeurs of the Guard
2nd Voltigeurs of the Guard
Chasseurs of the Guard
2nd Brigade : Gen. Garnier
3rd Voltigueurs of the Guard
4th Voltigueurs of the Guard
1st Division Artillery : Lt. Col. Gerbaut
2 Guard Foot batteries (4-pdr. guns)
1 Guard Mitrailleuse battery
3rd Engineer Regiment (1 company)
2nd Infantry Division : Gen. Joseph Alexandre Picard
1st Brigade : Gen. Pierre Joseph Jeanningros
Zouaves of the Guard
1st Grenadiers of the Guard
2nd Brigade : Gen. Le Poittetin de la Croix
2nd Grenadiers of the Guard
3rd Grenadiers of the Guard
2nd Division Artillery : Lt. Col. de Cevilly
2 Guard Foot Artillery batteries (4-pdr. guns)
1 Guard Mitrailleuse battery
3rd Engineer Regiment (1 company)
Cavalry Division : Gen. Desvaux
1st Brigade : Gen. Halna du Fretay
Guides
Chasseurs of the Guard
2nd Brigade : Gen. De France
Lancers of the Guard
Dragoons of the Guard
3rd Brigade : Gen. du Preuil
Cuirassiers of the Guard
Carabiniers of the Guard
2 Horse Artillery batteries (4-pdr. guns)
1st Corps (1er corps) : Marshal Patrice de MacMahon
1st Infantry Division : Gen. Auguste-Alexandre Ducrot
1st Brigade : Gen. Wolff
18th Line Infantry Regiment
96th Line Infantry Regiment
13th Chasseur Battalion
2nd Brigade : Gen. de Postis du Houlbec
45th Line Infantry Regiment
1st Regiment of Zouaves
1st Division Artillery : Lt. Col. Lecoeutre
2 Foot Artillery batteries (4-pdr. guns)
1 Mitrailleuse battery
1st Engineer Regiment (1 company)
2nd Infantry Division : Gen. Abel Douay
1st Brigade : Gen. Pelletier de Montmarie
50th Line Infantry Regiment
74th Line Infantry Regiment
16th Chasseur Battalion
2nd Brigade : Gen. Pelle
78th Line Infantry Regiment
1st Regiment of Turcos
2nd Division Artillery : Lt. Col. Cauvet
2 Foot Artillery batteries (4-pdr. guns)
1 Mitrailleuse battery
1st Engineer Regiment (1 company)
3rd Infantry Division : Gen. Raoult
1st Brigade : Gen. L'Heriller
2nd Zouave Regiment
36th Line Infantry Regiment
8th Chasseur Battalion
2nd Brigade : Gen. Lefebvre
2nd Regiment of Turcos
48th Line Infantry Regiment
3rd Division Artillery : Lt. Col. Cheguillaume
2 Foot Artillery batteries (4-pdr. guns)
1 Mitrailleuse battery
1st Engineer Regiment (1 company)
4th Infantry Division : Gen. Lartigue
1st Brigade : Gen. Fraboulet de Kerleade
3rd Zouave Regiment
56th Line Infantry Regiment
1st Chasseur Battalion
2nd Brigade : Gen. Charles Nicolas Lacretelle
3rd Regiment of Turcos
87th Line Infantry Regiment
4th Division Artillery : Lt. Col. Lamande
2 Foot Artilley batteries (4 pdr guns)
1 Mitrailleuse battery
1st Engineer Regiment (1 company)
Cavalry Division : Gen. Duhesme
1st Brigade : Gen. de Septeuil
3rd Hussar Regiment
11th Chasseur Regiment
2nd Brigade : Gen. de Nansouty
2nd Lancer Regiment
3rd Lancer Regiment
10th Dragoon Regiment
3rd Brigade : Gen. Michel
8th Cuirassiers Regiment
9th Cuirassiers Regiment
Reserve Artillery : Col. de Vassart
2 Foot batteries (4-pdr. guns)
2 Foot batteries (12-pdr. guns)
4 Horse Artillery batteries
1st Engineer Regiment (1 company)
2nd Corps (2e corps) : Gen. Charles Auguste Frossard
1st Infantry Division : Gen. Verge
1st Brigade : Gen. Letellier Valaze
32nd Line Infantry Regiment
55th Line Infantry Regiment
3rd Chasseur Battalion
2nd Brigade : Jolivet
76th Line Infantry Regiment
77th Line Infantry Regiment
1st Division Artillery : Lt. Col. Chavaudret
2 Foot Artilley batteries (4-pdr. guns)
1 Mitrailleuse battery
3rd Engineer Regiment (1 company)
2nd Infantry Division : Gen. Henri Jules Bataille
1st Brigade : Gen. Pouget
8th Line Infantry Regiment
23rd Line Infantry Regiment
12th Chasseur Battalion
2nd Brigade : Gen. Fauvart-Bastoul
66th Line Infantry Regiment
67th Line Infantry Regiment
2nd Division Artillery : Lt. Col. de Maintenant
2 Foot Artilley batteries (4-pdr. guns)
1 Mitrailleuse battery
3rd Engineer Regiment (1 company)
3rd Infantry Division : Gen. Jules de Laveaucoupet
1st Brigade : Gen. Doens
2nd Line Infantry Regiment
63rd Line Infantry Regiment
10th Chasseur Battalion
2nd Brigade : Gen. Michelet
24th Line Infantry Regiment
40th Line Infantry Regiment
3rd Division Artillery : Lt. Col. Larrogue
2 Foot Artilley batteries (4-pdr. guns)
1 Mitrailleuse battery
3rd Engineer Regiment (1 company)
Cavalry Division : Gen. Marmier
1st Brigade : Gen. de Valabregue
4th Chasseur Regiment
5th Chasseur Regiment
2nd Brigade : Gen. Bachelier
7th Dragoon Regiment
12th Dragoon Regiment
Reserve Artillery : Col. Beaudouin
2 Foot batteries (4-pdr. guns)
2 Foot batteries (12-pdr. guns)
4 Horse Artillery batteries
3rd Engineer Regiment (2 companies)
3rd Corps (3e corps) : Marshal Achille Bazaine
1st Infantry Division
1st Brigade : Gen. Montaudon
51st Line Infantry Regiment
62nd Line Infantry Regiment
18th Chasseur Battalion
2nd Brigade : Gen. Justin Clinchant
81st Line Infantry Regiment
95th Line Infantry Regiment
1st Division Artillery : Lt. Col. Fourgous
2 Foot Artilley batteries (4-pdr. guns)
1 Mitrailleuse battery
2nd Infantry Division : Gen. Armand Alexandre de Castagny
1st Brigade : Gen. Nayral
19th Line Infantry Regiment
41st Line Infantry Regiment
15th Chasseur Battalion
2nd Brigade : Gen. Duplessis
69th Line Infantry Regiment
90th Line Infantry Regiment
2nd Division Artillery : Lt. Col. Delange
2 Foot Artilley batteries (4-pdr. guns)
1 Mitrailleuse battery
1st Engineer Regiment (1 company)
3rd Infantry Division : Gen. Metman
1st Brigade : Gen. de Potier
7th Line Infantry Regiment
29th Line Infantry Regiment
7th Chasseur Battalion
2nd Brigade : Gen. Eugène Arnaudeau
59th Line Infantry Regiment
71st Line Infantry Regiment
3rd Division Artillery : Lt. Col. Sempe
2 Foot Artilley batteries (4-pdr. guns)
1 Mitrailleuse battery
1st Engineer Regiment (1 company)
4th Infantry Division : Gen. Claude Théodore Decaen
1st Brigade : Gen. de Brauer
44th Line Infantry Regiment
60th Line Infantry Regiment
11th Chasseur Battalion
2nd Brigade : Gen. Sanle-Ferriere
80th Line Infantry Regiment
85th Line Infantry Regiment
4th Division Artillery : Lt. Col. Maucoutant
2 Foot Artilley batteries (4-pdr. guns)
1 Mitrailleuse battery
1st Engineer Regiment (1 company)
Cavalry Division : Gen. de Cleraembault
1st Brigade : Gen. de Bruchard
2nd Chasseur Regiment
3rd Chasseur Regiment
10th Chasseur Regiment
2nd Brigade : Gen. Maubranches
2nd Dragoon Regiment
4th Dragoon Regiment
3rd Brigade : Baron de Juniac
5th Dragoon Regiment
8th Dragoon Regiment
Reserve Artillery : Col. de Lajaille
2 Foot Artilley batteries (4-pdr. guns)
2 Foot Artilley batteries (12-pdr. guns)
4 Horse Artillery batteries
2nd Engineer Regiment (1 and 1/2 companies)
4th Corps (4e corps) : Gen. Paul de Ladmirault
1st Infantry Division : Gen. Ernest Courtot de Cissey
1st Brigade : Gen. Count Brayer
1st Line Infantry Regiment
6th Line Infantry
20th Chasseur Battalion
2nd Brigade : Gen. de Golberg
57th Line Infantry Regiment
73rd Line Infantry Regiment
1st Division Artillery : Lt. Col. de Narp
2 Foot Artilley batteries (4-pdr. guns)
1 Mitrailleuse battery
2nd Engineer Regiment (1 company)
2nd Infantry Division : Gen. Grenier
1st Brigade : Gen. Bellecourt
13th Line Infantry Regiment
43rd Line Infantry Regiment
5th Chasseur Battalion
2nd Brigade : Gen. Pradier
64th Line Infantry Regiment
98th Line Infantry Regiment
2nd Division Artillery : Lt. Col. de Larminat
2 Foot Artilley batteries (4-pdr. guns)
1 Mitrailleuse battery
2nd Engineer Regiment (1 company)
3rd Infantry Division : Gen. Count Latrille de Lorencez
1st Brigade : Gen. Pajol
15th Line Infantry Regiment
33rd Line Infantry Regiment
2nd Chasseur Battalion
2nd Brigade : Gen. Berger
54th Line Infantry Regiment
65th Line Infantry Regiment
3rd Division Artillery : Lt. Col. Legardeur
2 Foot Artilley batteries (4-pdr. guns)
1 Mitrailleuse battery
2nd Engineer Regiment (1 company)
Cavalry Division : Gen. Legrand
1st Brigade : Gen. de Montaigu
2nd Hussar Regiment
7th Hussar Regiment
2nd Brigade : Gen. de Gondrecourt
3rd Dragoon Regiment
11th Dragoon Regiment
Reserve Artillery : Col. de Solille
2 Foot Artilley batteries (4-pdr. guns)
2 Foot Artilley batteries (12-pdr. guns)
4 Horse Artillery batteries
2nd Engineer Regiment (1 company)
5th Corps (5e corps) : Gen. Pierre Louis Charles de Failly
1st Infantry Division : Gen. Goze
1st Brigade : Gen. Grenier
11th Line Infantry Regiment
46th Line Infantry Regiment
4th Chasseur Battalion
2nd Brigade : Gen. Nicolas
61st Line Infantry Regiment
86th Line Infantry Regiment
1st Division Artillery
2 4-pounder batteries
1 Mitrailleuse battery
2nd Infantry Division : Gen. de l'Abadie d'Aydroin
1st Brigade : Gen. Lapasset
49th Line Infantry Regiment
84th Line Infantry Regiment
14th Chasseur Battalion
2nd Brigade : Gen. de Maussion
88th Line Infantry Regiment
97th Line Infantry Regiment
2nd Division Artillery
2 4-pounder batteries
1 Mitrailleuse battery
3rd Infantry Division : Gen. Guyot de Lespart
1st Brigade : Gen. Abbatucci
17th Line Infantry Regiment
27th Line Infantry Regiment
19th Chasseur Battalion
2nd Brigade : Gen. de Fontanges de Couzan
30th Line Infantry Regiment
68th Line Infantry Regiment
3rd Division Artillery
2 4-pounder batteries
1 Mitrailleuse battery
Cavalry Division : Gen. Brahaut
1st Brigade : Gen. Pierre de Bernis
5th Chasseur Regiment
12th Chasseur Regiment
2nd Brigade : Gen. de la Mortière
3rd Lancer Regiment
5th Lancer Regiment
Cavalry Division Artillery
1 Horse Artillery battery
Reserve Artillery : Col. de Salignac-Fénelon
2 Foot Artilley batteries (4-pdr. guns)
2 Foot Artilley batteries (12-pdr. guns)
2 Horse Artillery batteries
6th Corps (6e corps) : Marshal François Certain Canrobert
1st Infantry Division : Gen. Tixier
1st Brigade : Gen. Péchot
4th Line Infantry Regiment
10th Line Infantry Regiment
9th Chasseur Battalion
2nd Brigade : Gen. Le Roy de Dais
12th Line Infantry Regiment
100th Line Infantry Regiment
1st Division Artillery
2 4-pounder batteries
1 Mitrailleuse battery
2nd Infantry Division : Gen. Bisson
1st Brigade : Gen. Noël
9th Line Infantry Regiment
14th Line Infantry Regiment
2nd Brigade : Gen. Maurice
20th Line Infantry Regiment
30th Line Infantry Regiment
2nd Division Artillery
2 4-pounder batteries
1 Mitrailleuse battery
3rd Infantry Division : Gen. La Font de Villiers
1st Brigade : Gen. Becquet de Sonnay
75th Line Infantry Regiment
91st Line Infantry Regiment
2nd Brigade : Gen. Colin
93rd Line Infantry Regiment
3rd Division Artillery
2 4-pounder batteries
1 Mitrailleuse battery
4th Infantry Division : Gen. Levassor-Sorval
1st Brigade : Gen. Julius Richardson de Marguenat
25th Line Infantry Regiment
26th Line Infantry Regiment
2nd Brigade : Gen. de Chanaleilles
28th Line Infantry Regiment
70th Line Infantry Regiment
4th Division Artillery
2 4-pounder batteries
1 Mitrailleuse battery
Cavalry Division : Gen. de Salignac-Fénelon
1st Brigade : Gen. Tilliard
1st Hussar Regiment
6th Chasseur Regiment
2nd Brigade : Gen. Savaresse
1st Lancer Regiment
7th Lancer Regiment
3rd Brigade : Gen. de Béville
5th Cuirassier Regiment
6th Cuirassier regiment
Cavalry Division Artillery
2 Horse Artillery batteries
Reserve Artillery : Col. de Montluisant
2 4-pounder batteries
2 12-pounder batteries
4 Horse Artillery batteries
7th Corps (7e corps) : Gen.  Félix Charles Douay
1st Infantry Division : Gen. Conseil-Dumesnil
1st Brigade : Gen. Le Norman de Bretteville
3rd Line Infantry Regiment
21st Line Infantry Regiment
17th Chasseur Battalion
2nd Brigade : Gen. Maire
47th Line Infantry Regiment
99th Line Infantry Regiment
1st Division Artillery
2 4-pounder batteries
1 Mitrailleuse batteries
2nd Infantry Division : Gen. Liébert
1st Brigade : Gen.  Guiomar
5th Line Infantry Regiment
37th Line Infantry Regiment
6th Chasseur Battalion
2nd Brigade : Gen. de la Bastide
53rd Line Infantry Regiment
89th Line Infantry Regiment
2nd Division Artillery
2 4-pounder batteries
1 Mitrailleuse battery
3rd Infantry Division : Gen. Dumont
1st Brigade : Gen. Bordas
52nd Line Infantry Regiment
72nd Line Infantry Regiment
2nd Brigade : Gen. Bittard des Portes
82nd Line Infantry Regiment
83rd Line Infantry Regiment
3rd Division Artillery
2 4-pounder batteries
1 Mitrailleuse battery
Cavalry Division : Gen. Ameil
1st Brigade : Gen. Cambriel
4th Hussar Regiment
4th Lancer Regiment
8th Lancer Regiment
2nd Brigade : Gen. Jolif du Coulombier
6th Hussar Regiment
6th Dragoon Regiment
Cavalry Division Artillery
1 Horse Artillery battery
Reserve Artillery
2 4-pounder batteries
2 12-pounder batteries
2 Horse Artillery batteries
 Cavalry Reserve Corps (Corps de réserve de cavalerie)
1st Division : Gen. du Barrail
1st Brigade : Gen. Jean Auguste Margueritte
1st Chasseurs d'Afrique
3rd Chasseurs d'Afrique
2nd Brigade : Gen. de Lajaille
2nd Chasseurs d'Afrique
4th Chasseurs d'Afrique
1st Division Artillery
2 Horse Artillery batteries
2nd Division : Gen. de Bonnemains
1st Brigade : Gen. Girard
1st Cuirassier Regiment
2nd Cuirassier Regiment
2nd Brigade (?)
3rd Cuirassier Regiment
4th Cuirassier Regiment
2nd Division Artillery
2 Horse Artillery batteries
3rd Division : Gen. Marquis de Forton
1st Brigade : Gen. Prince Joachim Murat
1st Dragoon Regiment
9th Dragoon Regiment
2nd Brigade : Gen. de Grammont
7th Cuirassier Regiment
10th Cuirassier Regiment
3rd Division Artillery
2 Horse Artillery batteries
Artillery Reserve : Gen. Cann
13th Field-Artillery Regiment
8 12-pounder batteries
18th Field-Artillery Regiment
8 horse artillery batteries
3 mountain batteries

French Infantry divisions were square divisions, with two infantry brigades of two infantry regiments each. Generally, one brigade per division also had a light infantry (chasseur) battalion.  French cavalry divisions were also generally square, with two brigades of two regiments each, but the cavalry divisions of the Imperial Guard Corps, the 1st Corps, and the 6th Corps had three brigades.

French Regimental Histories (source = French Wikipedia)

Germany

Order of battle on 1 August 1870:

Commander in Chief: Wilhelm I (King of Prussia)

Chief of the General Staff: General Helmuth von Moltke
Quarter-Master General: Generalleutnant Eugen Anton Theophil von Podbielski
Inspector-General of Artillery: General der Artillerie Gustav Eduard von Hindersin
Inspector-General of Engineers: Generalleutnant Franz von Kleist
Commissary-General: Generalleutnant Albrecht von Stosch
Staff Department Chiefs: Oberstleutnant Paul Bronsart von Schellendorff; Oberstleutnant Julius von Verdy du Vernois; Oberstleutnant Karl von Brandenstein

First Army
Commander: General Karl Friedrich von Steinmetz (later General von Manteuffel)

Chief of Staff: Generalmajor Oskar von Sperling

VII Army Corps (VII. Armeekorps) (Westphalia) : General der Infanterie Heinrich von Zastrow
13th Infantry Division : Generalleutnant Adolf von Glümer
25th Brigade: Generalmajor Leo Baron von der Osten-Sacken
1st Westphalian Infantry Regiment, No. 13
Hanoverian Fusilier Regiment, No. 73
26th Brigade: Generalmajor Kuno Baron von der Goltz
2nd Westphalian Infantry Regiment, No. 15
6th Westphalian Infantry Regiment, No. 55
Attached to Division
7th Westphalian Jäger Battalion
1st Westphalian Hussar Regiment, No. 8
Five batteries (two heavy, two light, and one horse-artillery) of the 7th Field-artillery Regiment
2nd Field-pioneer Company, 7th Corps, with entrenching tool-column
3rd Field-pioneer Company, 7th Corps
14th Infantry Division : Generalleutnant Georg von Kameke
27th Brigade : Generamajor Curt von François
Lower Rhine Fusilier Regiment, No. 39
1st Hanoverian Infantry Regiment, No. 74
28th Brigade : Generalmajor Wilhelm von Woyna
5th Westphalian Infantry Regiment, No. 53
2nd Hanoverian Infantry Regiment, No. 77
Attached to Division
Four batteries (two heavy and two light) of the 7th Westphalian field-artillery Regiment
Hanoverian Hussar Regiment, No. 15
1st Field-pioneer Company, 7th Corps, with light bridging-train
Corps Artillery : Oberst Rudolf von Helden-Sarnowski
Two Horse artillery, two light, and two heavy field-batteries of the 7th Field-artillery regiment
Artillery Ammunition columns
Infantry Ammunition columns
Pontoon columns
7th Westphalian Train Battalion
VIII Army Corps (VIII. Armeekorps) (Rhine Provinces) : General der Infanterie August Karl von Goeben
15th Infantry Division : Generalleutnant Ludwig von Weltzien
29th Brigade : Generalmajor Karl Friedrich von Wedel
East Prussian Fusilier Regiment, No. 33
7th Brandenburg Infantry Regiment, No. 60
30th Brigade : Generalmajor Otto von Strubberg
2nd Rhine Province Infantry Regiment, No. 28
4th Magdeburg Infantry Regiment, No. 67
Attached to Division
8th Rhine Province Jäger Battalion
King's Hussar Regiment (1st Rhine), No. 7
Four batteries (two heavy, two light) of 8th Field-Artillery Regiment
2nd Field-pioneer Company, 8th Corps, with entrenching tool-column
16th Infantry Division : Generalleutnant Albert von Barnekow
31st Brigade : Generalmajor Count Neidhardt von Gneisenau
3rd Rhine Province Infantry Regiment, No. 29
7th Rhine Province Infantry Regiment, No. 69
32nd Brigade : Oberst Rudolf von Rex
Hohenzollern Fusilier Regiment, No. 40
4th Thüringian Infantry Regiment, No. 72
Attached to Division
2nd Rhine Hussar Regiment, No. 9
Four batteries (two heavy, two light) of 8th Field-artillery Regiment
1st Field-pioneer Company, 8th Corps, with light bridging-train
3rd Field-pioneer Company, 8th Corps
Corps Artillery : Oberst Rudolf von Broecker
Two batteries of horse-artillery, two heavy and two light field batteries of the 8th Field-artillery Regiment
Artillery and Infantry ammunition columns and pontoon columns belonging to the 8th Field-artillery Regiment
8th Rhenish Train Battalion
3rd Cavalry Division : Generalleutnant Count Georg von der Gröben
6th Cavalry Brigade : Generalmajor Richard von Mirus
Rhine Provinces Cuirassier Regiment, No. 8
Rhine Provinces Uhlan Regiment, No. 7
7th Cavalry Brigade : Generalmajor Siegmar Count zu Dohna-Schlobitten
Westphalian Uhlan Regiment, No. 5
2nd Hanoverian Uhlan Regiment, No. 14
One battery of horse-artillery of the 7th Westphalian Field-artillery Regiment
I Army Corps (I. Armeekorps) (East Prussia) : General der Kavallerie Edwin Freiherr von Manteuffel
1st Infantry Division : Generalleutnant Georg Ferdinand von Bentheim
1st Brigade : Generalmajor Wilhelm von Gayl
Crown Prince's Grenadier Regiment (1st East Prussian), No. 1
5th East Prussian Infantry Regiment, No. 41
2nd Brigade : Generalmajor Louis von Falkenstein
2nd East Prussian Grenadier Regiment, No. 3
6th East Prussian Infantry Regiment, No. 43
Attached to Division
East Prussian Jäger Battalion, No. 1
Lithuanian Dragoon Regiment, No. 1
Four batteries (two heavy, two light) of 1st East Prussian Field-artillery Regiment
2nd Field-pioneer Company, 1st Corps, with entrenching tool-column
3rd Field-pioneer Company, 1st Corps
2nd Infantry Division : Generalleutnant Gustav von Pritzelwitz
3rd Brigade : Generalmajor Albert von Memerty
3rd East Prussian Grenadier Regiment, No. 4
7th East Prussian Infantry Regiment, No. 44
4th Brigade : Generamajor Karl von Zglinitzki
4th East Prussian Grenadier Regiment, No. 5
8th East Prussian Infantry Regiment, No. 45
Attached to Division
East Prussian Dragoon Regiment, No. 10
Four batteries (two heavy, two light) of 1st, East Prussian, Field-artillery Regiment
1st Field-pioneer Company, 1st Corps, with light bridging-train
Corps-Artillery : Oberst Maximilian Jungé
Two horse artillery batteries, two light field batteries, two heavy field batteries of 1st (East Prussian) Field-artillery Regiment
Artillery and Infantry ammunition, and pontoon columns belonging to 1st Field-artillery Regiment
The 1st East Prussian Train Battalion
1st Cavalry Division : Generalleutnant Julius von Hartmann
1st Cavalry Brigade : Generalmajor Hermann von Lüderitz
2nd (Pomeranian) Cuirassiers “Queen”, No. 2
1st Pomeranian Uhlan Regiment, No. 4
2nd Pomeranian Uhlan Regiment, No. 9
2nd Cavalry Brigade : Generalmajor August von Baumgarth
East Prussian Cuirassier Regiment, No. 3
East Prussian Uhlan Regiment, No. 8
Lithuanian Uhlan Regiment, No. 12
One battery of horse-artillery of the 1st, East Prussian, Field-artillery regiment

Second Army
Commander: General der Kavallerie Prince Frederick Charles of Prussia

Chief of Staff: Oberst Gustav von Stiehle
Guards Corps (Gardekorps) : General der Kavallerie Prince August of Württemberg
1st Guards Infantry Division
1st Guards Infantry Brigade
1st Foot Guards
3rd Foot Guards
Guards Fusiliers
2nd Guards Infantry Brigade
2nd Foot Guards
4th Foot Guards
Divisional Troops
Guards Jäger Battalion
Guards Hussars
1st Foot Battalion, Guards Artillery
2nd Guards Infantry Division
3rd Guards Infantry Brigade
1st Guards Grenadiers
3rd Guards Grenadiers
4th Guards Infantry Brigade
2nd Guards Grenadiers
4th Guards Grenadiers
Divisional Troops
Guards Rifles Battalion
2nd Guards Uhlans
3rd Foot Battalion, Guards Artillery
Guards Cavalry Division
1st Guards Cavalry Brigade
Gardes du Corps
Guards Cuirassiers
2nd Guards Cavalry Brigade
1st Guards Uhlans
3rd Guards Uhlans
3rd Guards Cavalry Brigade
1st Guards Dragoons
2nd Guards Dragoons
Corps Artillery
2nd Foot Battalion, Guards Artillery
Horse Artillery Battalion, Guards Artillery
Guards Train Battalion
Guards Engineer Battalion
III Army Corps (III. Armeekorps) (Brandenburg) : Generalleutnant Constantin von Alvensleben
5th Infantry Division : Generalleutnant Ferdinand von Stülpnagel
9th Brigade : Generalmajor Wilhelm von Doering
Leib-Grenadier Regiment (1st Brandenburg), No. 8
5th Brandenburg Infantry Regiment, No. 48
10th Brigade : Generalmajor Kurt von Schwerin
2nd Brandenburg Grenadier Regiment, No. 12
6th Brandenburg Infantry Regiment, No. 52
Attached to Division
Brandenburg Jäger Battalion, No. 3
2nd Brandenburg Dragoon Regiment, No. 12
Four batteries (two heavy, two light) of the Brandenburg Field-artillery Regiment, No. 3
3rd Field-pioneer Company, 3rd Corps
6th Infantry Division : Generalleutnant Gustav Freiherr von Buddenbrock
11th Brigade : Generalmajor Louis von Rothmaler
3rd Brandenburg Infantry Regiment, No. 20
Brandenburg Fusilier Regiment, No. 35
12th Brigade : Oberst  Hugo von Bismarck
4th Brandenburg Infantry Regiment, No. 24
8th Brandenburg Infantry Regiment, No. 64
Attached to Division
1st Brandenburg Dragoon Regiment, No. 2
Four batteries (two heavy, two light) of the Brandenburg Field-artillery Regiment, No. 3
2nd Field-pioneer Company, 3rd Corps, with entrenching tool-column
Corps-Artillery: Oberst Julius von Dresky und Merzdorf
Two horse artillery batteries, two light field batteries, two heavy field batteries of the Brandenburg Field-artillery Regiment, No. 3
1st Field-pioneer Company, 3rd Corps, with light bridging-train
Artillery ammunition, Infantry ammunition, and pontoon columns of the Brandenburg Field-artillery Regiment, No. 3
Brandenburg Train Battalion
IV Army Corps (IV. Armeekorps) (Saxon provinces and Anhalt) : General der Infanterie Gustav von Alvensleben
7th Infantry Division : Generalleutnant Julius von Groß genannt von Schwarzhoff
13th Brigade : Generalmajor August von Borries
1st Magdeburg Infantry Regiment, No. 26
3rd Magdeburg Infantry Regiment, No. 66
14th Brigade : Generalmajor Franz von Zychlinski
2nd Magdeburg Infantry Regiment, No. 27
Anhalt Infantry Regiment, No. 93
Attached to Division
Magdeburg Jäger Battalion, No. 4
Westphalian Dragoon Regiment, No. 7
Four batteries (two heavy, two light) of the Magdeburg Field-artillery Regiment
2nd Field-pioneer Company, 4th Corps, with entrenching tool-column
3rd Field-pioneer Company, 4th Corps
8th Infantry Division : Generalleutnant Alexander von Schoeler
15th Brigade : Generalmajor Friedrich von Kessler
1st Thüringian Infantry Regiment, No. 31
3rd Thüringian Infantry Regiment, No. 71
16th Brigade : Oberst Karl von Scheffler
Schleswig-Holstein Fusilier Regiment, No. 86
7th Thüringian Infantry Regiment, No. 96
Attached to Division
Thüringian Hussar Regiment, No. 12
Four batteries (two heavy, two light) of the Magdeburg Field-artillery Regiment, No. 4
1st Field-pioneer Company, 4th Corps, with light bridge-train
Corps-Artillery : Oberst Albert Crusius
Two horse artillery batteries, two light field batteries, two heavy field batteries of the Magdeburg Field-artillery Regiment, No. 4
Artillery ammunition, infantry ammunition, and pontoon columns belonging to Magdeburg Field-artillery Regiment, No. 4
Magdeburg Train Battalion, No. 4
IX Army Corps (IX. Armeekorps) (Schleswig-Holstein and Hesse) : General der Infanterie Albrecht Gustav von Manstein
18th Infantry Division : Generalleutnant Karl von Wrangel
35th Brigade : Generalmajor Heinrich von Blumenthal
Magdeburg Fusilier Regiment, No. 36
Schleswig Infantry Regiment, No. 84
36th Brigade : Generalmajor Ferdinand von Below
2nd Silesian Grenadier Regiment, No. 11
Holstein Infantry Regiment, No. 85
Attached to Division
Lauenburg Jäger Battalion, No. 9
Magdeburg Dragoon Regiment, No. 6
Four batteries (two heavy, two light) of Schleswig-Holstein Field-artillery Regiment, No. 9
2nd Field-pioneer Company, 9th Corps, with entrenching tool-column
3rd Field-pioneer Company, 9th Corps
Grand Ducal Hessian (25th) Infantry Division : Generalleutnant Prince Louis of Hesse
49th Brigade : Generalmajor Ludwig von Wittich
1st Infantry Regiment (Body Guard)
2nd Infantry Regiment (Grand Duke's)
1st (Guard) Jäger Battalion
50th Brigade : Oberst Ludwig von Lyncker
3rd Infantry Regiment
4th Infantry Regiment
2nd Jäger Battalion
(25th) Cavalry Brigade : Generalmajor Ludwig Baron von Schlotheim
1st Reiter Regiment (Guard Cheveauxlegers)
2nd Reiter Regiment (Leib Chevauxlegers)
One battery of horse-artillery, five field-batteries (two heavy, three light)
Pioneer company with light field bridge-train
Corps-Artillery : Oberst Hans Karl Wilhelm von Jagemann
One horse artillery battery, two light field batteries, two heavy field batteries of the Schleswig-Holstein Field-artillery Regiment, No. 9
X Army Corps (X. Armeekorps) (Hanover, Oldenburg and Brunswick) : General der Infanterie Konstantin Bernhard von Voigts-Rhetz
19th Infantry Division : Generalleutnant Emil von Schwartzkoppen
37th Brigade : Oberst Peter von Lehmann
East Frisian Infantry Regiment, No. 78
Oldenburg Infantry Regiment, No. 91
38th Brigade : Generalmajor Georg von Wedell
3rd Westphalian Infantry Regiment, No. 16
8th Westphalian Infantry Regiment, No. 57
Attached to Division
1st Hanoverian Dragoon Regiment, No. 9
Four batteries (two heavy, two light) of Hanoverian Field-artillery Regiment, No. 10
2nd Field-pioneer Company, 10th Corps, with entrenching tool-column
3rd Field-pioneer Company, 10th Corps
20th Infantry Division : Generalmajor Alexander von Kraatz-Koschlau
39th Brigade : Generalmajor Emil von Woyna
7th Westphalian Infantry Regiment, No. 56
3rd Hanoverian Infantry Regiment, No. 79
40th Brigade : Generalmajor Karl von Diringshofen
4th Westphalian Infantry Regiment, No. 17
Brunswick Infantry Regiment, No. 92
Attached to Division
Hanoverian Jäger Battalion, No. 10
2nd Hanoverian Dragoon Regiment, No. 16
Four batteries (two heavy, two light) of Hanoverian Field-artillery Regiment, No. 10
1st Field-pioneer Company, 10th Corps, with light bridge-train
Corps Artillery : Oberst Moritz Baron von der Goltz
Two horse artillery batteries, two light field batteries, two heavy field batteries of Hanoverian Field-artillery Regiment, No. 10
Artillery and Infantry ammunition columns belonging to Hanoverian Field-artillery Regiment, No. 10
Hanoverian Train Battalion, No. 10
XII. (Royal Saxon) Army Corps (XII. (Kgl. Sächs.) Armeekorps) : Crown Prince Albert of Saxony
23rd (Royal Saxon) Infantry Division : Generalleutnant H.R.H. Prince George of Saxony, afterwards Generalmajor von Montbé
1st Brigade, No. 45 : Generalmajor Ernst von Craushaar
1st (Leib) Grenadier Regiment, No. 100
2nd (King William of Prussia) Grenadier Regiment, No. 101
Rifle (Fusilier) Regiment, No. 108
2nd Brigade, No. 46 : Oberst Alban von Montbé
3rd Infantry Regiment (Crown Prince's), No. 102
4th Infantry Regiment No. 103
Attached to Division
1st Reiter Regiment (Crown Prince's)
Four batteries (two heavy, two light) of 12th Field-artillery Regiment
2nd Company of 12th Pioneer Battalion with entrenching tool-column
4th Company of 12th Pioneer Battalion
24th (Royal Saxon) Infantry Division : Generalmajor Gustav Erwin Nehrhoff von Holderberg
3rd Brigade, No. 47: Generalmajor August Emil Tauscher
5th Infantry Regiment (Prince Frederic August's), No. 104
6th Infantry Regiment, No. 105
1st Jäger Battalion (Crown Prince's), No. 12
4th Brigade, No. 48 : Oberst Julius von Schulz
7th Infantry Regiment (Prince George's), No. 106
8th Infantry Regiment, No. 107
2nd Jäger Battalion, No. 13
Attached to Division
2nd Reiter Regiment
Four batteries (two heavy, two light) of 12th Field-artillery Regiment
3rd company of 12th Pioneer Battalion with light bridge-train
12th Cavalry Division : Generalmajor Franz Count of Lippe
1st Cavalry Brigade, No. 23 : Generalmajor Karl Krug von Nidda
Guard Reiter Regiment
1st Uhlan Regiment, No. 17
2nd Cavalry Brigade, No. 24 : Generalmajor Hugo Senfft von Pilsach
3rd Reiter Regiment
2nd Uhlan Regiment, No. 18
Attached to Division
One battery of horse-artillery of 12th Field-artillery Regiment
Corps Artillery : Oberst Bernhard Oskar von Funcke
One horse artillery battery, three light field batteries, three heavy field batteries of the 12th Field Artillery Regiment
Artillery and Infantry ammunition, and pontoon columns of the 12th Field-artillery Regiment
12th Train Battalion
5th Cavalry Division : Generalleutnant Albert Baron von Rheinbaben
11th Cavalry Brigade : Generalmajor Adalbert von Barby
Westphalian Cuirassier Regiment, No. 4
1st Hanoverian Uhlan Regiment, No. 13
Oldenburg Dragoon Regiment, No. 19
12th Cavalry Brigade : Generalmajor Adalbert von Bredow
Magdeburg Cuirassier Regiment, No. 7
Altmark Uhlan Regiment, No. 16
Schleswig-Holstein Dragoon Regiment, No. 13
13th Cavalry Brigade : Generalmajor Hermann von Redern
Magdeburg Hussar Regiment, No. 10
2nd Westphalian Hussar Regiment, No. 11
Brunswick Hussar Regiment, No. 17
Attached to Division
Two batteries horse-artillery
6th Cavalry Division : Generalleutnant H.S.H. Duke William of Mecklenburg-Schwerin
14th Cavalry Brigade : Generalmajor Otto Baron von Diepenbroick-Grüter
Brandenburg Cuirassier Regiment, No. 6 (Emperor Nicholas I. of Russia)
1st Brandenburg Uhlan Regiment, No. 3 (Emperor of Russia)
Schleswig-Holstein Uhlan Regiment, No. 15
15th Cavalry Brigade : Generalmajor Gustav Waldemar von Rauch
3rd Hussars “von Zieten”
16th Hussars
Attached to Division
One battery of horse-artillery
II Army Corps (II. Armeekorps) (Pomerania) : General der Infanterie Eduard von Fransecky
3rd Infantry Division : Generalmajor Ernst von Hartmann
5th Brigade : Generalmajor Heinrich von Koblinski
Grenadier Regiment King Frederic William IV. (1st Pomeranian), No. 2
5th Pomeranian Infantry Regiment, No. 42
6th Brigade : Oberst Eberhard von der Decken
3rd Pomeranian Infantry Regiment, No. 14
7th Pomeranian Infantry Regiment, No. 54
Attached to Division
Pomeranian Jäger Battalion, No. 2
Neumark Dragoon Regiment, No. 3
Four batteries (two heavy, two light) of the 2nd Pomeranian Field-artillery Regiment
1st Field-pioneer Company, 2nd Corps, with light bridge-train
4th Infantry Division : Generalleutnant Hann von Weyhern
7th Brigade : Generalmajor Albert von Trossel
Colberg Grenadier Regiment (2nd Pomeranian), No. 9
6th Pomeranian Infantry Regiment, No. 49
8th Brigade : Generalmajor Karl von Kettler
4th Pomeranian Infantry Regiment, No. 21
8th Pomeranian Infantry Regiment, No. 61
Attached to Division
Pomeranian Dragoon Regiment, No. 11
Four batteries (two heavy, two light) of Pomeranian Field-artillery Regiment, No. 2
2nd Field-pioneer Company, 2nd Corps, with entrenching tool-column
3rd Field-pioneer Company, 2nd Corps
Corps Artillery : Oberst Wilhelm Petzel
Two horse artillery batteries, two light field batteries, two heavy field batteries of the Pomeranian Field-artillery Regiment, No. 2
Artillery and infantry ammunition and pontoon columns of Pomeranian Field-artillery Regiment, No. 2
Pomeranian Train Battalion, No. 2

Third Army
Commander: Crown Prince of Prussia

Chief of Staff: Generalleutnant Leonhard von Blumenthal

V Army Corps (V. Armeekorps) (Posen and Liegnitz) : Generalleutnant Hugo von Kirchbach
9th Infantry Division : Generalmajor Karl Gustav von Sandrart
17th Brigade : Oberst Alfred von Bothmer
3rd Posen Infantry Regiment, No. 58
4th Posen Infantry Regiment, No. 59
18th Brigade : Generalmajor William von Voigts-Rhetz
King's Grenadier Regiment (2nd West Prussian), No. 7
2nd Lower Silesian Infantry Regiment, No. 47
Attached to Division:
1st Silesian Jäger Battalion, No. 5
1st Silesian Dragoon Regiment, No 4
Four batteries (two heavy, two light) of the Lower Silesian Field-artillery Regiment, No. 5
1st Field-pioneer Company, 5th Corps, with light bridge-train
10th Infantry Division : Generalleutnant Christoph von Schmidt
19th Brigade : Oberst Otto von Henning auf Schönhoff
1st West Prussian Grenadier Regiment, No. 6
1st Lower Silesian Infantry Regiment, No. 46
20th Brigade : Generalmajor Rudolf Walther von Montbary
Westphalian Fusilier Regiment, No. 37
3rd Lower Silesian Infantry Regiment, No. 50
Attached to Division:
Kurmark Dragoon Regiment, No. 14
Four batteries (two heavy, two light) of Field-artillery Regiment, No. 5
2nd Field-pioneer Company, 5th Corps, with entrenching tool-column
3rd Field-pioneer Company, 5th Corps
Corps-Artillery : Oberstleutnant Gustav Köhler
Two horse artillery batteries, two light field batteries, two heavy field batteries of the Lower Silesian Field-artillery Regiment, No. 5
Artillery and infantry ammunition, and pontoon columns of Field-artillery Regiment, No. 5
Lower Silesian Train Battalion, No. 5
XI Army Corps (XI. Armeekorps) (Hesse, Nassau, Saxe-Weimar etc.) : Generalleutnant Julius von Bose
21st Infantry Division : Generalleutnant Hans von Schachtmeyer
41st Brigade : Oberst Hermann von Koblinski
Hessian Fusilier Regiment, No. 80
1st Nassau Infantry Regiment, No. 87
42nd Brigade : Generalmajor Hugo von Thiele
2nd Hessian Infantry Regiment, No. 82
2nd Nassau Infantry Regiment, No. 88
Attached to Division:
Hessian Jäger Battalion, No. 11
2nd Hessian Hussar Regiment, No. 14
Four batteries (two heavy, two light) of Hessian Field-artillery Regiment No. 11
1st Field-pioneer Company, 11th Corps, with light bridge-train
22nd Infantry Division : Generalleutnant Hermann von Gersdorff
43rd Brigade : Oberst Hermann von Kontzki
2nd Thüringian Infantry Regiment, No. 32
6th Thüringian Infantry Regiment, No. 95
44th Brigade : Generalmajor Bernhard von Schkopp
3rd Hessian Infantry Regiment, No. 83
5th Thüringian Infantry Regiment, No. 94
Attached to Division:
1st Hessian Hussar Regiment, No. 13
Four batteries (two heavy, two light) of Hessian Field-artillery Regiment
2nd Field-pioneer Company, 11th Corps, with entrenching tool-column
3rd Field-pioneer Company, 11th Corps
Corps-Artillery : Oberst Hermann von Oppeln-Bronikowski
Two horse artillery batteries, two light field batteries, two heavy field batteries of Hessian Field-artillery Regiment, No. 11
Artillery and Infantry ammunition, and pontoon columns of 11th Field-artillery Regiment
Hessian Train Battalion, No. 11
I Royal Bavarian Corps (Kgl. Bayer. I. Korps) : General der Infanterie Ludwig Freiherr von der Tann
1st Royal Bavarian Division : Generalleutnant Baptist von Stephan
1st Brigade : Generalmajor Karl Dietl
Royal Bavarian Infantry Lifeguards Regiment
Two battalions of 1st Infantry Regiment (King's)
2nd Jäger Battalion
2nd Brigade : Generalmajor Karl von Orff
2nd Infantry Regiment (Crown Prince's)
Two battalions of 11th Infantry Regiment (v. d. Tann)
4th Jäger Battalion
Attached to Division:
9th Jäger Battalion
3rd Chevauxlegers Regiment (Duke Maximilian's)
Two 4-pounder and two 6-pounder batteries
2nd Royal Bavarian Division : Generalleutnant Karl Count Pappenheim
3rd Brigade : Generalmajor Ignaz Schumacher
3rd Infantry Regiment (Prince Charles of Bavaria)
Two battalions of 12th Infantry Regiment (Queen Amalie of Greece)
1st Jäger Battalion
4th Brigade : Generalmajor Rudolph Baron von der Tann-Rathsamhausen
10th Infantry Regiment (Prince Louis)
Two battalions of 13th Infantry Regiment (Emperor Francis Joseph of Austria)
7th Jäger Battalion
Attached to Division:
4th Chevauxlegers Regiment (King's)
Two 4-pounder and two 6-pounder batteries
Cuirassier Brigade : Generalmajor Johann Baptist von Tausch
1st Cuirassier Regiment (Prince Charles of Bavaria)
2nd Cuirassier Regiment (Prince Adalbert)
6th Chevauxlegers Regiment (Grand Duke Constantine Nicolajusitch)
One battery of horse-artillery
Brigade of Reserve-Artillery : Oberst Heinrich Bronzetti
1st Division. Two 6-pounder, one 4-pounder battery
2nd Division. Two 6-pounder batteries
3rd Division. Two 6-pounder batteries
1st Field-Engineer Division
II Royal Bavarian Corps (Kgl. Bayer. II. Korps) : General der Infanterie Jakob von Hartmann
3rd Royal Bavarian Division : Generalleutnant Friedrich Wilhelm Walther von Walderstötten
5th Brigade : Generalmajor Wilhelm von Schleich
6th Infantry Regiment (King William of Prussia)
Two battalions of 7th Infantry Regiment (Hohenhausen)
8th Jäger Battalion
6th Brigade : Oberst Börries von Wissell
Two battalions of 14th Infantry Regiment (Hartmann)
15th Infantry Regiment (King John of Saxony)
3rd Jäger Battalion
Attached to Division:
1st Chevauxlegers Regiment (Emperor Alexander of Russia)
Two 4-pounder and two 6-pounder batteries
4th Royal Bavarian Division : Generallleutnant Friedrich Count von Bothmer
7th Brigade : Generalmajor Heinrich Ritter von Thiereck
Two battalions of 5th Infantry Regiments (Grand Duke of Hesse)
9th Infantry Regiment (Werde)
6th Jäger Battalion
8th Brigade : Generalmajor Joseph Maillinger
3rd battalion of 1st Infantry Regiment
3rd battalion of 5th Infantry Regiment
1st battalion of 7th Infantry Regiment
3rd battalion of 11th Infantry Regiment
3rd battalion of 14th Infantry Regiment
5th Jäger Battalion
Attached to Division:
10th Jäger Battalion
2nd Chevauxlegers Regiment
Two 4-pounder and two 6-pounder batteries
Uhlan Brigade : Generalmajor Wilhelm Baron von Mulzer
1st Uhlan Regiment (Archduke Nicholas of Russia)
2nd Uhlan Regiment (King's)
5th Chevauxlegers Regiment (Prince Otto's)
One battery of horse-artillery
Brigade of Reserve Artillery : Oberst Johann von Pillement
1st Division: One 4-pounder horse-artillery battery, two 6-pounder field batteries
2nd Division: Two 6-pounder field batteries
3rd Division: Two 6-pounder field batteries
2nd Field-Engineer Division
Combined Württemberg-Baden Corps (Kombiniertes Württembergisch-Badisches Korps)
Württemberg Field Division : Generallleutnant Hugo von Obernitz
1st Infantry Brigade : Generalmajor Karl Bernhard von Reitzenstein
1st Infantry Regiment (Queen Olga) (two battalions)
7th Infantry Regiment (two battalions)
2nd Jäger Battalion
2nd Infantry Brigade : Generalmajor Adolf von Starkloff
2nd Infantry Regiment (two battalions)
5th Infantry Regiment (King Charles's battalion)
3rd Jäger Battalion
3rd Infantry Brigade : Generalmajor Adolf Baron von Hügel
3rd Infantry Regiment (two battalions)
8th Infantry Regiment (two battalions)
1st Jäger Rattalion
Cavalry Division (Reiter-Division) : Generalmajor Friedrich Count von Scheler
1st Reiter Regiment (King Charles) (four squadrons)
2nd Reiter Regiment (King William) (two squadrons)
4th Reiter Regiment (Queen Olga) (four squadrons)
1st Field-artillery Division:
Two 4-pounder and one 6-pounder batteries
2nd Field-artillery Division
Two 4-pounder and one 6-pounder batteries
3rd Field-artillery Division
Two 4-pounder and one 6-pounder batteries
Baden Field Division : Generalleutnant Gustav von Beyer
1st Infantry Brigade : Generalleutnant Karl du Jarrys von La Roche
1st Leib Grenadier Regiment
Fusilier battalion of 4th Infantry Regiment
2nd Grenadier Regiment (King of Prussia)
Combined (3rd) Infantry Brigade : Generalmajor Adolf Keller
3rd Infantry Regiment
5th Infantry Regiment
Attached to Division:
3rd Dragoon Regiment (Prince Charles)
Four batteries (two heavy, two light)
Company of pontooners with light bridge-train and entrenching tool-column
Cavalry Brigade : Generalmajor Udo Baron von La Roche-Starkenfels
1st Leib Dragoon Regiment
2nd Dragoon Regiment (Margrave Maximilian)
One battery of horse-artillery
Corps-Artillery
Two heavy and two light field batteries
4th Cavalry Division : General der Kavallerie H.R.H. Prince Albert of Prussia
8th Cavalry Brigade : Generalmajor Hiob von Hontheim
West Prussian Cuirassier Regiment, No. 5
Posen Uhlan Regiment, No. 10
9th Cavalry Brigade : Generalmajor Otto von Bernhardi
West Prussian Uhlan Regiment, No. 1
Thüringian Uhlan Regiment, No. 6
10th Cavalry Brigade : Generalmajor Rudolf von Krosigk
2nd Leib Hussar Regiment, No. 2
Rhine Province Dragoon Regiment, No. 5
Two batteries of horse-artillery
VI Army Corps (VI. Armeekorps) (Silesia) : General der Kavallerie Wilhelm von Tümpling
11th Infantry Division : Generalleutnant Helmuth von Gordon
21st Brigade : Generalmajor Wilhelm von Malachowski und Griffa
1st Silesian Grenadier Regiment, No. 10
1st Posen Infantry Regiment, No. 18
22nd Brigade : Generalmajor Alexander von Eckartsberg
Silesian Fusilier Regiment, No. 38
4th Lower Silesian Infantry Regiment, No. 51
Attached to Division:
2nd Silesian Jäger Battalion, No. 6
2nd Silesian Dragoon Regiment, No. 8
Four batteries (two heavy, two light) of the Silesian Field-artillery Regiment, No. 6
3rd Field-pioneer Company, 6th Corps
12th Infantry Division : Generalleutnant Otto von Hoffmann
23rd Brigade : Generalmajor William Hounsell von Gündell
1st Upper Silesian Infantry Regiment, No. 22
3rd Upper Silesian Infantry Regiment, No. 62
24th Brigade: Generalmajor Hermann von Fabeck
2nd Upper Silesian Infantry Regiment, No. 23
4th Upper Silesian Infantry Regiment, No. 63
Attached to Division:
3rd Silesian Dragoon Regiment, No. 15
Four batteries (two heavy, two light) of the Silesian Field-artillery Regiment, No. 6
1st Field-pioneer Company, 6th Corps, with light bridge-train
2nd Field-pioneer Company, 6th Corps, with entrenching tool-column
Corps-Artillery: Oberst Karl Arnold
Two horse artillery batteries, two light field batteries, two heavy field batteries of the Silesian Field-artillery Regiment, No. 6
Artillery and Infantry ammunition, and pontoon columns of Silesian Field-artillery Regiment
Silesian Train Battalion, No. 6
2nd Cavalry Division : Generalleutnant Wilhelm Count of Stolberg-Wernigerode
3rd Cavalry Brigade : Generalmajor Enno von Colomb
Silesian Leib Cuirassier Regiment, No. 1
Silesian Uhlan Regiment, No. 2
4th Cavalry Brigade : Generalmajor Gustav Baron von Barnekow
1st Leib Hussar Regiment, No. 1
Pomeranian Hussar Regiment (Blucher's Hussars), No. 5
5th Cavalry Brigade : Generalmajor Friedrich von Baumbach
1st Silesian Hussar Regiment, No. 4
2nd Silesian Hussar Regiment, No. 6
Two batteries of horse-artillery

Reserve
General Command over mobile troops in the I, II, IX, and X Corps Areas
17th Infantry Division
Guard Landwehr Infantry Division
1st Guard Landwehr Brigade
1st Guard Landwehr Regiment
2nd Guard Landwehr Regiment
2nd Guard Landwehr Brigade
1st Guard Grenadier Landwehr Regiment
2nd Guard Grenadier Landwehr Regiment
1st Landwehr Division
1st Pomeranian Landwehr Brigade
1st Combined Pomeranian Landwehr Regiment
2nd Combined Pomeranian Landwehr Regiment
2nd Pomeranian Landwehr Brigade
3rd Combined Pomeranian Landwehr Regiment
4th Combined Pomeranian Landwehr Regiment
2nd (Brandenburg) Landwehr Division
1st Brandenburg Landwehr Brigade
1st Combined Brandenburg Landwehr Regiment
2nd Combined Brandenburg Landwehr Regiment
2nd Brandenburg Landwehr Brigade
3rd Combined Brandenburg Landwehr Regiment
4th Combined Brandenburg Landwehr Regiment
3rd Combined Landwehr Division
West Prussian Landwehr Brigade
West Prussian Combined Landwehr Regiment
Lower Silesian Combined Landwehr Regiment
Posen Landwehr Brigade
1st Combined Posen Landwehr Regiment
2nd Combined Posen Landwehr Regiment
16 Landwehr Cavalry Regiments
Reserve Foot Battalions of the Guard and 11 Line Artillery Regiments

Belgium
Though not a belligerent in the conflict, the Belgian army was mobilized and placed on readiness at the country's borders in fear of a preemptive attack by either party through the neutral territory during the Franco-Prussian War. (See Belgium and the Franco-Prussian War).

Commander-in-Chief: King Leopold II

Chief of Staff: Lieutenant General Bruno Renard

Minister of War: Major General Henri Guillaume

Army of Observation
The Army of Observation (Armée d'Observation) numbered approximately 55,000 men. Its role was to defend the country's borders.

Commander: Lieutenant-General Baron Félix Chazal

Chief of Staff: Colonel Monoyer

1st Army Corps (Ier corps d'armée)
Commanded by Lieutenant-General Sapin
2nd Army Corps (IIe corps d'armée)
Commanded by Prince Philippe
Artillery
Reserve Cavalry
Auxiliary units (Railway, logistics, telegraphic etc.)

Army of Antwerp
The Army of Antwerp (Armée d'Anvers), based in the "National Redoubt" fortress in Antwerp, numbered approximately 15,000. It was a defensive force, designed to hold the city of Antwerp alone. Approximately 8,000 additional men served as guards at other fortresses around the country, including Liège.

Commander: Lieutenant-General Alexis-Michel Eenens

Chief of Staff: Colonel Henri Alexis Brialmont

Notes

Sources

 A. Niemann, Der französische Feldzug 1870-1871 (Verlag des Bibliographischen Instituts, Hildburghausen, 1871).
 

Orders of battle